John Esten "Billick" Whelchel (April 1, 1898 – November 5, 1973) was a decorated officer in the United States Navy with the rank of Vice Admiral, American football player, coach, and college athletics administrator. He served as the head football coach at the United States Naval Academy from 1942 to 1943, compiling a record of 13–5. In 1949, he was the head coach for the National Football League's Washington Redskins, tallying a mark of 3–3–1.

Early life
Whelchel was born on April 1, 1898, in Hogansville, Georgia, but he spent his childhood in Washington, D.C. His family had a deep history with the military: his maternal grandfather James Longstreet was a general for the Confederate States Army during the American Civil War while his older brother James Longstreet Whelchel went to the United States Military Academy.

After graduating from Western High School, Whelchel attended the United States Naval Academy in Annapolis, Maryland, where he played quarterback and halfback for the Navy Midshipmen football team. He was also on the school's basketball and baseball programs. He graduated in 1919. During his studies at the Academy, he also served in European water during World War I as a midshipman.

Navy coaching career
Upon his return to the United States and graduation, Whelchel was assigned to the football coaching staff under head coach Gil Dobie followed by Dobie's successor Bob Folwell. In 1926, he helped out the school's freshman team. He served at the Academy until 1927, when he was transferred to the battleship .

As his service in the Navy continued, Whelchel coached the football teams for various naval installations during the 1920s and 1930s beginning with the Florida. His service assignments at Norfolk Naval Shipyard and aboard the  also saw coaching stints.

On June 22, 1938, now Lieutenant Commander Whelchel was appointed a Commanding Officer of newly commissioned Destroyer . McCall was assigned to the patrol duty in the Pacific and Whelchel spent next two years at sea with Destroyer Squadron Six, Battle Force, under the command of Freeland A. Daubin. He was finally succeeded by Lieutenant Commander Edwin G. Fullinwider on June 15, 1940.

Whelchel returned to the Naval Academy in 1941, where he became backfield coach of football team under Swede Larson. At the end of the season, Larson departed for the United States Marine Corps as the country entered World War II and Whelchel was promoted to head coach in his place. Whelchel inherited a team in a difficult situation as the demands of the war, which forced the Naval Academy to condense the academic curriculum into a three-year course, meant only six starters returned to the team for 1942. Prior to the season, he described the upcoming schedule as "suicide" and "about hopeless" to succeed in. While the Midshipmen regressed from their 7–1–1 record the previous year, they defeated Army to finish 5–4. On December 18, Whelchel was named Captain and the Naval Academy's new athletic director, the latter of which he took over from former college teammate Lyman S. Perry Sr.

The Midshipmen improved in 1943 to an 8–1 record and ranked fourth in the final AP poll. Whelchel's team developed a reputation for its strong defense, with an observer calling him "a great guy for rigging up a defense for one game. He isn't too fancy on attack, but he knows all the answers on defense." He won the Lambert Trophy at the end of the year.

When Whelchel was called into service in the Pacific theater, his position as head coach was filled by Commander Oscar Hagberg, who was returning from there.

Sea duties during World War II

Whelchel was transferred to the Pacific theater in 1944 and subsequently took command of heavy cruiser  on March 10, 1945, where he succeeded another American football player Harvey Overesch. Whelchel commanded that ship during the Battle of Okinawa and was subsequently awarded with Legion of Merit with "V" Device and Bronze Star Medal for his leadership of the ship. In July, the Imperial Japanese Navy claimed to have sunk the San Francisco, which was refuted by the Navy.

Whelchel continued in command of the USS San Francisco and sailed toward the Philippines to prepare for an invasion of the Japanese home islands. The cessation of hostilities in mid-August, ceased any combat operations, and Whelchel began to prepare San Francisco for occupation duty. During August 1945, Whelchel commanded the ship during the show of force in the Yellow Sea and Gulf of Pohai areas and subsequently covered minesweeping operations.

On November 27, 1945, San Francisco was ordered back to the United States, arriving at San Francisco in the middle of December. Whelchel commanded the ship to the East Coast, where she arrived at Philadelphia for inactivation on January 19, 1946.

Whelchel was subsequently assigned to the Naval Station Pearl Harbor, where he was the chief of staff for the United States Pacific Fleet's ComServPac. He also returned to football as an assistant for the Hawaiian Warriors coached by Keith Molesworth. In November 1947, he was promoted to the rank of rear admiral. He also received his second Legion of Merit during his assignment.

Upon permission from Secretary of the Navy, John L. Sullivan, Whelchel retired from the active service in 1949. He was advanced to the rank of Vice admiral on the basis of combat citations. Whelchel was also eligible for retirement pensions due to the longevity of his service.

Washington Redskins
In 1948, George Preston Marshall, the owner and president of the Washington Redskins of the National Football League, became unhappy with the work of Redskins head coach Turk Edwards. Despite the team's success in the first half of the decade, they suffered from a lack of continuity at the head coaching position with predecessors Dutch Bergman and Dudley DeGroot resigning amid tensions with leadership. Marshall declared he would pursue a "nationally known coach", but surprised fans when he hired Whelchel instead; Marshall explained he selected Whelchel "out of hundreds of applicants" as he "like[d] his football ability."

Although Whelchel ran the single-wing formation as Navy's head coach, he opted to retain the Redskins' T formation. He also kept Edwards' assistants Herman Ball, Frank Walton, and Wilbur Moore on his staff.

Despite not having coached in six years, Whelchel quickly developed a rapport with players. Redskins quarterback Sammy Baugh described Whelchel in Myron Cope's book, The Game that was:

Marshall thought the admiral would put a lot of discipline in the ball club. Well he showed up, and he looked like anything but an admiral. He was just a kind of average-looking guy, not very impressive. And the funny thing was, he turned out to be a real nice fellow. All the player liked him, although he wasn't as up on his football as he should have been.

Another Washington player, John Koniszewski, recalled his experiences with Whelchel at training camp:

He's using psychology on us, and I like it. Take that first day of camp, for example, when he let us play tough football and left us completely alone. We did more work than we would have done with routine stuff.

Whelchel's Redskins opened the 1949 season with a 38–7 loss to the Chicago Cardinals. Spending only seven games with the Redskins, Whelchel was dismissed by Marshall after a game against the Pittsburgh Steelers.  Before his final game, Whelchel told his players:

Gentlemen, this is my last game as coach of the Redskins. You are a fine group of men and a good football team. I wish you all success in the world in your future games. Washington will be proud of you." After a pause, he added: "I'd like to win this last game."

The Redskins beat the Steelers, 27–14. Whelchel's record with the Redskins was 3–3–1. He was replaced by Ball. The Redskins finished the 1949 season with a record of 4–7–1.

Later life
After his dismissal from Redskins, Whelchel worked in real estate and then in farming. Vice admiral John Esten Whelchel died on November 5, 1973, in Portsmouth, Virginia at the age of 75. He was buried together with both his wives Virginia D. Hoover Whelchel (1897–1941) and Marion Payne Whelchel (1900–1980) at Arlington National Cemetery. He also had a son from his first marriage with Virginia D. Hoover, John Esten Whelchel, Jr. (1935–2008).

Wartime decorations

Here is the ribbon bar of Vice admiral John E. Whelchel:

Head coaching record

College

References

1898 births
1973 deaths
American football halfbacks
American football guards
American football quarterbacks
Navy Midshipmen athletic directors
Navy Midshipmen baseball players
Navy Midshipmen football coaches
Navy Midshipmen football players
Navy Midshipmen men's basketball players
Washington Redskins coaches
United States Navy personnel of World War I
United States Navy World War II admirals
United States Navy admirals
Recipients of the Legion of Merit
People from Hogansville, Georgia
Burials at Arlington National Cemetery
Washington Redskins head coaches